The Englishman and the Girl was a 1910 short comedy film directed by D. W. Griffith. Being restored by Film Preservation Society.

Plot
A small town's drama group is preparing for a Pocahontas-type play, when one of the member's English relatives suddenly arrives for a visit. This man, unlike the theater group, does not have any sense of humor, which sparks the relative and his friends to play practical jokes on him. They dress up as Indians to scare them, but the Englishman is so convinced, that he grabs his gun to shoot at them. At another moment, they try to get revenge by pretending to attack him, but the plan again backfires when the Englishman uses a prop gun from a heroine to horrify them.

Cast
 Charles Craig as Albert Wilberforce
 Mary Pickford as The Girl
 George Nichols as Mr. Thayer
 Kate Bruce as Mrs. Thayer
 Gladys Egan as The Child
 Ruth Hart as A Friend
 Dorothy West as A Friend/Member of Dramatic Club
 Francis J. Grandon as In Store/Member of Dramatic Club
 Anthony O'Sullivan as In Store/Member of Dramatic Club
 Mack Sennett as In Store/Member of Dramatic Club
 Linda Arvidson as Member of Dramatic Club
 Dell Henderson as Member of Dramatic Club
 W. Chrystie Miller as Member of Dramatic Club
 Gertrude Robinson as Member of Dramatic Club
 Thomas H. Ince
 Florence Barker

See also
 List of American films of 1910
 D. W. Griffith filmography
 Mary Pickford filmography

References

External links

1910 films
1910 comedy films
Silent American comedy films
American silent short films
American black-and-white films
Films directed by D. W. Griffith
Lost American films
Biograph Company films
1910 short films
American comedy short films
Lost comedy films
1910 lost films
1910s American films